Bob Power is an American Grammy Award–winning and multi-platinum record producer, audio engineer, composer, arranger, performer, and music educator.

Early life
Power was born in Chicago, moved to Rye, New York, then moved to St. Louis, Missouri, and attended Webster College, where he studied music theory.

He also studied classical composition and conducting, alongside playing his own contemporary music.  He subsequently obtained a master's degree in jazz from Lone Mountain College (since acquired by University of San Francisco) in San Francisco.

Career
Power stayed in California between 1975 and 1982, scoring music for the PBS Emmy Award–winning television series Over Easy and writing music for broadcast advertising. Power contributed music for advertising campaigns for companies, including The American Cancer Society (Emmy Award winner), AT&T, Casio, Coca-Cola, Elizabeth Arden, Hardee's, Hertz, Intel, Mercedes-Benz, Purina, and The United States Postal Service.

He then moved to New York City in 1982 to further his music career by playing gigs in a variety of venues, including one performance at a wedding of a member of the Bensonhurst Mafia.

Power was asked by the owner of Calliope Studios to sit in as engineer of a music recording session by the group Stetsasonic. Stetsasonic thought so highly of Power's work that he continued to work with them, overseeing the breakthrough sessions for their album On Fire.

He continued his liaison with rap groups thereafter, linking up with the New York City rap collective the Native Tongues. The Native Tongues was a group of hip-hop groups, including A Tribe Called Quest, Black Sheep, De La Soul, and Jungle Brothers. All of the musical groups within the collective based their music around intricately designed and complex arrangements of sampling.

Power's ability to produce music that mimicked the clarity of the sampled recordings was highly valued by producers within the Native Tongues.

His most noteworthy project as an engineer is his work on A Tribe Called Quest's sophomore album The Low End Theory, which was recorded between 1990 and 1991 and released in September 1991. Power describes his work on The Low End Theory in the following quote:

By the mid-1990s, Power ran a production suite at Sony Music Studios in New York. His profile continued to expand through his record production work with Me'Shell N'degéocello, The Roots, D'Angelo, and Erykah Badu. The latter saw Power get his first number 1 R&B single, "On & On," while N’degéocello's Peace Beyond Passion received a nomination for a Grammy Award as 'best engineered album'.

Recent career
Bob Power is currently an Arts Professor in the Clive Davis Institute of Recorded Music at New York University's Tisch School of the Arts located in New York City.

References

External links

1952 births
Living people
Musicians from Chicago
Webster University alumni
American audio engineers
Record producers from Illinois
Musicians from New York (state)
New York University faculty
Engineers from Illinois